It's Been a Long Time is the first CD release from Ju-Taun in the summer of 2003.

Track listing
"It's Been a Long Time" (Co-Written by Keith Huggins Sr.) – 4:50
"Gold Diggin" – 4:52
"Back To Back" – (Co-Written by Jeff Von Stenz) 3:34
"Can We Go Slow" – 4:26
"Temporary" – 3:52
"It's Been A Long Time" (Radio Version) – 3:41

2003 debut albums